Bitmeyen Şarkı is a Turkish Series featuring Bulent Inal as Yaman & Berguzar Korel as Feraye. This summer series is beautiful summed up along with marvelous acting of the lead actors and melodious voice of Berguzar Korel.

Synopsis
Feraye (Berguzar Korel) doesn't believe in beautiful days, people & Miracles. Her ultimate aim is to find her son who was taken away from her by force 8 years ago. Although, she works as a singer in a night club, she manages to maintain her innocence. She is beautiful, young & decent girl in her difficult and dark world. One day, in order to save her work place, she reluctantly accepts an invitation to a dinner on a luxury yacht with a powerful businessman. However, dinner doesn't go on according to the plan and Feraye had to jump into the sea. On the verge of death, she is saved by a young man Yaman (Bulent Inal). This accident which is the beginning of the hope for a greater love changes both the life of Yaman & Feraye.

In this love story you will explore a difficult love of Yaman and Feraye, who are made for each other yet from different worlds. How will Yaman reacts when he learns that Feraye is a singer in a night club. Will the love of Yaman and Feraye stand by the secret buried in Feraye's past ? Will Feraye manage to find her son ?

Series overview

International broadcasters
After the major success of 1001 Nights in South America, Berguzar Korel's Endless Song will soon be available to South American world in Spanish language.
{| class="wikitable" style="text-align:left; line-height:14px; background:#f8f8ff; width:72%;"
|-
! Country
! Local Name
! Network
! Premiere date
|-
|  Arab World
|  أغنية الحب 
| MBC
| 2012
|-
|  Kosovo
| Kënga e Pambaruar
| RTV21
| 2016
|-
|  Somaliland
| Xikmaddii Jacaylka
| Horn Cable Television
| 2013
|-
|  
Albania
| Kenga e Pambaruar
| Tema TV
| 2019
|-
|  Romania
| Cântec fără sfârșit
| Kanal D
| 2011–2012
|-

Turkish television series
Television shows set in İzmir
Television shows set in Istanbul
Television series produced in Istanbul
Television series set in the 2010s